Max Hoff also Max Hof – an alias of Maximilian J.A. Hofbauer – (1903–1985) was an illustrator famous especially for his advertisements for Simpsons of Piccadilly and Astor Cigarettes. His art was perfectly representing the fashion of the 1950s and 1960s in Western Europe and North America. He was born in Vienna.

Biography

Early years
Hoff studied portrait and landscape painting at the Academy of Fine Arts in Vienna, where he had begun to make a name for himself through his stage and costume illustrations. A number of his fashion designs had been published under the alias Max Hof in the European journal International Textiles, where Alec Simpson – the owner of Simpsons of Piccadilly – saw them.

Simpsons of Piccadilly
In 1936 Alec Simpson brought Hoff – at the age of 33 – to London, and commissioned him to produce a series of illustrations of handsome, virile, sporting men - wearing Simpson clothes - that were to become the representation of Simpson style for a quarter of a century (joined – once Simpson Piccadilly added women's clothes to its stock – by fashionable, elegant and charming women). First used in the direct mail brochures, Hoff's illustrations soon became the mainstay of Simpson advertising. Bill Crawford - the advertising agent of Simpson's - recognized the power of this imagery, and when Hitler annexed Austria in 1938 Crawford persuaded Max Hoff to move to London, where he married Margarete Popper in December of the same year and where his two children were born.

His drawings of groups of impeccably dressed and homosocial male figures, virtually always depicted in a smiling and relaxed attitude, became the signature style of Simpson’s and DAKS men’s wear press advertising right up until the early 1960s.

FeWa and Astor Cigarettes
Already at the end of the 1950s Hoff started to work with the German advertisement agency Hanns W. Brose GmbH and its enigmatic owner Hanns Walter Brose in Frankfurt am Main. In 1958 a small campaign of only eight ads - due to a limited budget of Böhme Fettchemie GmbH - his illustrations were advertising FeWa FeinWaschmittel (fine washing powder).

As the work with Brose was going very well and Simpson's decided to rebrand their advertisement, Hoff finished his work with Simpson's and from 1961 on became an exclusive advertisement artist for the Hanns W. Brose GmbH.

This happened due to the fact that Hanns W. Brose - who had an advertising contract for Reemtsma's Astor Cigarettes for some years – wanted to acquire a second contract with another cigarette trademark of Reemtsma Haus Neuerburg. Therefore, in 1956 he agreed with Philipp F. Reemtsma to transfer the Astor contract to his branch office in Hamburg, managed by Brose's son Heinz Martin.

In 1961 Heinz Martin Brose decided to provide a new style for their ad campaign for Astor Cigarettes. So has started Hoff's most famous campaign called Rendezvous der Prominenz, which ran until 1967. It was directed first at the German and then at the international high society. Max Hoff has provided far over 200 pictures for this series.

References
 "The British Tradition. Simpson - a World of Style" by David Wainwright
 "Man Appeal: Advertising, Modernism and Menswear" by Paul Jobling
 "Die Entdeckung des Verbrauchers" by Hanns W. Brose

External links
 Special Exhibition "Werbewelten made in Hamburg"
 Archives of Vienna University
 Archives of "Museum der Arbeit" in Hamburg

1903 births
1985 deaths
Academy of Fine Arts Vienna alumni
Austrian illustrators
Fashion illustrators